List of Canadian divisions in World War I:

 1st Canadian Division embarked for France February 1915.
 2nd Canadian Division embarked September 1915.
 3rd Canadian Division formed in France, December 1915.
 4th Canadian Division formed in Britain, April 1916, embarked for France August of that year.
 5th Canadian Division began assembling in Britain in February, 1917, but was broken up in February 1918.

See also
 List of Canadian divisions in World War II

Canada World War I
Divisions in World War I
Canada divisions
 
Divisions